Alexandra "Alex" Johnson (born April 3, 1989) is an American rock climber who has made numerous first female ascents, including Clear Blue Skies  in Colorado, and Book of Nightmares  and Lethal Design  in Red Rocks. Her highest rated send as of 2022 was “The Swarm”  in Bishop. In 2009, she won the overall American Bouldering Series, and has twice won individual stages in the annual Bouldering World Cup series.

Biography
Alex Johnson was born and raised in Hudson, Wisconsin. She began climbing in 1997, won her first American Bouldering Series Youth Climbing National Championship in 2002 at age twelve, and won the Adult National Championships in 2003 at age thirteen. She continued to win professional bouldering competitions throughout her childhood, but in her last two years of high school she turned away from climbing to focus her energy on track, and in 2007 she won the Wisconsin State Championships in pole vaulting. This win helped her earn a track and field scholarship to attend Minnesota State University. 

In 2008, she won the first stage of the annual Bouldering World Cup series held in America (Anna Stöhr won the overall 2008 Bouldering World Cup).  After her first World Cup stage win, Johnson left Minnesota State University and moved to Colorado to focus on bouldering. She won the overall 2009 American Bouldering Series (ABS 10), and took second to Alex Puccio in another 2009 World Cup stage (Akiyo Noguchi won the overall 2009 Bouldering World Cup), but won a second World Cup stage in 2010 (Akiyo Noguchi also won the overall 2010 Bouldering World Cup). 

She then moved to Europe to train with the Austrian team, but after a string of disappointing finishes in 2011 and a bout of debilitating depression, Johnson returned to the US. Between 2012 and 2015, she placed well in several national and international competitions, including first place at the UBC Pro Tour Championships in 2012 and second place, again to Alex Puccio, in the American Bouldering Series National Championships.  After a three-year break from competition climbing, during which time she coached, Johnson returned in 2019 as part of a bid for the 2020 Olympics.

Although Johnson is best known as a competition climber, she has increasingly focused on outdoor climbing, and she has claimed the first female ascent of several notable outdoor problems, including Luminance, Whispers of Wisdom, Across the Tracks, Progressive Guy, Vigilante, Stake Your Claim, Diesel Power, Beyond Life, Dark Horse, Seek and Destroy, and Prune Tang at the V10 grade, Stand and Deliver, Drive On, Divergence, Gypsies, Tramps and Thieves, and Double Stack at V11, and Clear Blue Skies, The Mystery, Diaphanous Sea, and Lethal Design, and Book of Nightmares at V12. She has also done a successful ascent of “The Swarm” at V13/14. Like many women who have claimed first female ascents of difficult problems, Johnson faced controversy and the threat of a downgrade after many of her V12 first female ascents.

Personal life 
In 2018, Johnson accepted a job offer for head coach of her home-town gym, Vertical Endeavors, in St. Paul Minnesota and moved there with her girlfriend. Johnson coaches a group of 16 kids and is an ally and advocate for their success.

World Cup Medals

See also 
Alex Puccio, American bouldering climber
Angie Payne, American bouldering climber

References

American rock climbers
Female climbers
1989 births
Living people
People from Hudson, Wisconsin
American sportswomen
American LGBT sportspeople
Lesbian sportswomen
LGBT climbers
Competitors at the 2005 World Games
21st-century LGBT people
21st-century American women
American female climbers
Boulder climbers